Chileulia stalactitis is a species of moth of the family Tortricidae. It is found in Argentina (Río Negro Province) and possibly Chile.

References

Moths described in 1931
Euliini